Shororipu is a 2016 Bengali crime thriller film directed by Ayan Chakraborty. The film stars Chiranjeet Chakraborty, Indraneil Sengupta, and Rajatabha Dutta. The film released on 17 June 2016.

Plot 
Five high-profile murders take place one evening. Detective Chandrakanta is called to investigate. He deduces that all the murders are a crime of passion based on six human vices, the Shororipu.

Cast 

 Chiranjeet Chakraborty as Detective Chandrakanta
 Indraneil Sengupta as Shekhar
 Rajatabha Dutta as Joshua
 Rudronil Ghosh as Shuvodip
 Sohini Sarkar as Miss July
 Rajesh Sharma as Sharma
 Koneenica Banerjee as Konee
 Sudiptaa Chakraborty as Bonhi

References 

2016 films
Bengali-language Indian films
2010s Bengali-language films